Ilex grandiflora is a species of plant in the family Aquifoliaceae. It is endemic to Peninsular Malaysia. It is threatened by habitat loss.

References

grandiflora
Endemic flora of Peninsular Malaysia
Conservation dependent plants
Taxonomy articles created by Polbot